Henry W. Hoffman (February 27, 1868 – April 23, 1963) was a politician from Wisconsin.

Hoffman was born in Stockbridge, Wisconsin.
He was a member of the Wisconsin State Assembly during the 1915 session. Other positions he held include Town Treasurer and Town Clerk of Stockbridge. He was a Democrat. He died in Chilton, Wisconsin and was buried at Portland Cemetery.

References

External links
 

People from Stockbridge, Wisconsin
City and town treasurers in the United States
City and town clerks
1868 births
1963 deaths
Democratic Party members of the Wisconsin State Assembly